Frederick Michael Cole  (June 14, 1937 – October 11, 2013) was a Canadian football player who played for the Winnipeg Blue Bombers. He won the Grey Cup with them in 1959. He played college football with the University of Maryland Terrapins. Cole was also drafted in the 1959 NFL draft by the Chicago Bears (Round 6, #68 overall). After playing with Winnipeg, he also played a single season with the Los Angeles Chargers of the American Football League. He died in his native state of New Jersey in 2013.

References

1937 births
2013 deaths
American football guards
Maryland Terrapins football players
Winnipeg Blue Bombers players
Los Angeles Chargers players
Players of American football from Newark, New Jersey
Players of Canadian football from Newark, New Jersey